Andrea Braides (born 12 April 1961) is an Italian mathematician, specializing in the calculus of variations. He is a professor at the University of Rome Tor Vergata.

Education and career 

Born in Udine, Braides studied at the University of Pisa and Scuola Normale Superiore obtaining the degree in Mathematics (Laurea) in 1983 (Gamma-Limits of Functionals in the Calculus of Variations) supervised by Ennio de Giorgi and then at the corsi di perfezionamento (course of higher specialization) at Scuola Normale Superiore. He taught at the University of Udine in 1985-86 and then served two years of servizio civile. At the University of Brescia, he became in 1988 a research associate and in 1992 an associate professor. From 1995 to 2000 he was an associate professor at SISSA in Triest and from 2000 to the present a full professor at the University of Rome Tor Vergata.

He was a visiting professor at the Tata Institute of Fundamental Research (in 1994 and again in 2004), at the Max Planck Institute for Mathematics in the Sciences in Leipzig (in 1998), at Caltech, at the Centre Emile Borel in Paris, at the Isaac Newton Institute, at the University of Paris VI and the University of Paris XIII, at Carnegie-Mellon University, at Stanford University (Timoshenko scholar) and at the department of aerospace engineering at the University of Minnesota. He was a one-year visiting fellow at Mansfied College and visiting professor at the Mathematical Institute in Oxford in 2013-14.

Braides has done research on the calculus of variations, Gamma convergence, asymptotic homogenization, discrete variational problems, percolation, fracture mechanics, image processing, free-discontinuity problems, and geometric measure theory.

In 2014 he was an Invited Speaker at the International Congress of Mathematicians in Seoul with talk Discrete-to-continuum variational methods for lattice systems.

Selected publications

References

External links
Home page of Andrea Braides at the University of Rome Tor Vergata

1961 births
20th-century Italian mathematicians
21st-century  Italian mathematicians
University of Pisa alumni
People from Udine
Living people
Academic staff of the University of Rome Tor Vergata